Commonwealth is a book by autonomous Marxist theorists Michael Hardt and Antonio Negri. It completes a trilogy which includes Empire and Multitude: War and Democracy in the Age of Empire.

The influence of the book has paralleled the rise of the "common" as a concept at the center of the political and cultural debate.

Overview 
In Part 1 of the book the authors introduce the concept of "the republic of property". As such they state that "What is central for our purposes here is that the concept of property and the defense of property remain the foundation of every modern political constitution. This is the sense in which the republic, from the great bourgeois revolutions to today, is a republic of property".

In Part 2 the authors deal with the relationship between modernity and anti-modernity and end up proposing what they call "altermodernity". Altermodernity "involves not only insertion in the long history of antimodern struggles but also rupture with any fixed dialectic between modern sovereignty and antimodern resistance. In the passage from antimodernity to altermodernity, just as tradition and identity are transformed, so too resistance takes on a new meaning, dedicated now to the constitution of alternatives. The freedom that forms the base of resistance, as we explained earlier, comes to the fore and constitutes an event to announce a new political project."

Reception
For Alex Callinicos, "what is newest in Commonwealth is its take on the fashionable idea of the common. Hardt and Negri mean by this not merely the natural resources that capital seeks to appropriate, but also "the languages we create, the social practices we establish, the modes of sociality that define our relationships", which are both the means and the result of biopolitical production. Communism, they argue, is defined by the common, just as capitalism is by the private and socialism (which they identify in effect with statism) with the public."

For David Harvey, Negri and Hardt are "in the search of an altermodernity-something that is outside the dialectical opposition between modernity and anti-modernity-they need a means of escape. The choice between capitalism and socialism, they suggest is all wrong. We need to identify something entirely different, communism-working within a different set of dimensions." Also Harvey notes that "Revolutionary thought, Hardt and Negri argue, must find a way to contest capitalism and "the republic of property." It "should not shun identity politics but instead must work through it and learn from it," because it is the "primary vehicle for struggle within and against the republic of property since identity itself is based on property and sovereignty." In the same exchange in Artforum between Harvey and Michael Hardt and Antonio Negri, Hardt and Negri attempt to correct Harvey in a concept that is important within the argument of Commonwealth. As such they state that "We instead define the concept of singularity, contrasting it to the figure of the individual on the one hand and forms of identity on the other, by focusing on three aspects of its relationship to multiplicity: Singularity refers externally to a multiplicity of others; is internally divided or multiple; and constitutes a multiplicity over time - that is, a process of becoming."

See also 
Autonomism

References

Books by Antonio Negri and Michael Hardt
2009 non-fiction books
Political books
Communist theory
Marxist books
Autonomism